Trout is a 1978 Spanish film directed by José Luis García Sánchez. The film was entered into the 28th Berlin International Film Festival, where it won the Golden Bear.

Plot 
A satirization of middle class society under the rule of Franco, the plot concerns about an annual dinner of a fishing club whose members eat rotten trout while refusing to accept that there is a problem with it.

Cast

Release 
The film was presented at the 28th Berlin International Film Festival in February 1978. It was theatrically released in Spain on 1 April 1978. It grossed 31,244,437 ₧ (263,375 admissions).

See also 
 List of Spanish films of 1978

References

External links 
 
 

1978 films
Spanish comedy films
1970s Spanish-language films
Films set in Spain
Golden Bear winners
Films directed by José Luis García Sánchez
1970s Spanish films